Mitali Nag is an Indian television actress. She is known for portraying the role of Krishna Raj on Afsar Bitiya that aired on Zee TV.

Career
Nag began her acting career in 2011, when she was cast in the series Afsar Bitiya as Krishna Raj. In 2013, she bagged the role of Prerna in the Sony Entertainment Television show Dil Ki Nazar Se Khoobsurat. In the same year, she appeared in the episodic role of the horror supernatural series Fear Files: Darr Ki Sacchi Tasvirein. She also participated in the reality show Welcome – Baazi Mehmaan Nawazi Ki as a contestant. In early 2018, she was cast in the serial Roop - Mard Ka Naya Swaroop as Kamla Shamsher Singh, Roop’s mother.

Personal life
Mitali is married to Sankalpp Pardeshi. She has one son (born 2017).

Filmography

Nominations

References 

Indian television actresses
Living people
People from Maharashtra
1984 births
21st-century Indian actresses